This is a list of villages in Møre og Romsdal, a county of Norway.  The list excludes cities located in Møre og Romsdal.

See also
For other counties, see the lists of villages in Norway

References

External links 

More og Romsdal